Sathambadi is a village in the Udayarpalayam Taluk of Ariyalur district, Tamil Nadu, India.

Demographics 

As per the 2001 census, Sathambadi had a total population of 4047 with 2008 males and 2039 females.sathambadi North side have big forest is there Sathambadi is located about 1 km from Kolletam River.
 
Sathambadi has one school with up-to 10th standard and in this village there are some old temples devoted to Gods like Shiva, Perumal Mariamman, Selliamman and Kali.

The Mariamman Temple Timiti Festival will take place alternatively a year, which is a special local occasion.

In 2016, literacy level increased by 90% and most of them graduate working in top cities like Chennai, Coimbatore, Bangalore.

We are developing our village in many levels, like education, sports and green environment.

References 

Villages in Ariyalur district